In automata theory, an unambiguous finite automaton (UFA) is a nondeterministic finite automaton (NFA) such that each word has at most one accepting path. Each deterministic finite automaton (DFA) is an UFA, but not vice versa. DFA, UFA, and NFA recognize exactly the same class of formal languages.
On the one hand, an NFA can be exponentially smaller than an equivalent DFA. On the other hand, some problems are easily solved on DFAs and not on UFAs. For example, given an automaton A, an automaton A which accepts the complement of A can be computed in linear time when A is a DFA, it is not known whether it can be done in polynomial time for UFA. Hence UFAs are a mix of the worlds of DFA and of NFA; in some cases, they lead to smaller automata than DFA and quicker algorithms than NFA.

Formal definition 
An NFA is represented formally by a 5-tuple, .
 
 ri+1 ∈ Δ(ri, ai+1), for i = 0, ..., n−1  for 
 .

Example 
The figures show a DFA and a UFA accepting this language for n=2.

The minimal DFA accepting  has 2n states, one for each subset of {1...n}. There is an UFA of  states which accepts : it guesses the nth last letter, and then verifies that only  letters remain. It is indeed unambiguous as there exists only one nth last letter.

Inclusion, universality, equivalence 
Three PSPACE-hard problems for general NFA belong to PTIME for DFA and are now considered.

Inclusion 
It is decidable in polynomial-time whether an UFA's language is a subset of another UFA's language.

Let A and B be two UFAs. Let L(A) and L(B) be the languages accepted by those automata. Then L(A)⊆L(B) if and only if L(A∩B)=L(A), where A∩B denotes the Cartesian product automaton, which can be proven to be also unambiguous. Now, L(A∩B) is a subset of L(A) by construction; hence both sets are equal if and only if for each length n∈, the number of words of length n in L(A∩B) is equal to the number of words of length n in L(A). It can be proved that is sufficient to check each n up to the product of the number of states of A and B.

The number of words of length n accepted by an automaton can be computed in polynomial time using dynamic programming, which ends the proof.

Universality, equivalence 
The problem of universality and of equivalence, also belong to PTIME, by reduction to the inclusion problem.

Checking whether an automaton in unambiguous 
For a nondeterministic finite automaton  with  states and an  letter alphabet, it is decidable in time  whether  is unambiguous.

It suffices to use a fixpoint algorithm to compute the set of pairs of states q and q'  such that there exists a word w which leads both to q and to q' . The automaton is unambiguous if and only if there is no such a pair such that both states are accepting. There are Θ(n2) state pairs, and for each pair there are m letters to consider to resume the fixpoint algorithm, hence the computation time.

Some properties 
 The cartesian product of two UFAs is a UFA.
 The notion of unambiguity extends to finite state transducers and weighted automata. If a finite state transducer T is unambiguous, then each input word is associated by T to at most one output word. If a weighted automaton A is unambiguous, then the set of weight does not need to be a semiring, instead it suffices to consider a monoid. Indeed, there is at most one accepting path.

State complexity

Mathematical proofs that every UFA for a language needs a certain number of states were pioneered by Schmidt. Leung proved that a DFA equivalent to an -state UFA requires  states in the worst case, and that a UFA equivalent to a finitely ambiguous -state NFA requires  states in the worst case.

Jirásek, Jirásková and Šebej researched state complexity of basic regular operations on languages represented by UFA. They proved in particular that for every -state UFA where , the complement of the language it accepts is accepted by a UFA with at most  states. This result was later improved by Indzhev and Kiefer to at most  states for all .

For a one-letter alphabet Okhotin proved that a DFA equivalent to an -state UFA requires  states in the worst case.

Notes

References 
 Christof Löding, Unambiguous Finite Automata, Developments in Language Theory, (2013) pp. 29–30 (Slides)

Finite automata